The Canterville Ghost is a 2021 British BBC Studios and American BYUtv television series based on the short story The Canterville Ghost  by Oscar Wilde.

Plot
Resident ghost Sir Simon de Canterville is none-too-pleased when an American family moves into his family’s grand English estate after tech billionaire Hiram Otis purchases it. Hiram has no idea that Simon has been haunting the grounds for five centuries nor that his family is about to face the enmity of the local aristocracy. This modern retelling of the classic tale focuses on three families: the aristocratic Cantervilles, the Romani Lovells and the American Otises.

Cast
 Caroline Catz as Lucy Otis
 Fred Fergus as Viscount Ralph Stilton
 Tom Graves as Theodore Otis
 Joe Graves as Franklin Otis
 Haydn Gwynne as Lady Deborah de Canterville
 Anthony Head as Sir Simon de Canterville
 Jack Bardoe as The Honorable Cecil Canterville
 James Lance as Hiram Otis
 Carolyn Pickles as Mrs. Umney
 Jeff Rawle as Duke George 'Bluey' Stilton
 Charlotte Robinson as Charity Lovell
 Harriette Robinson as Patience Lovell
 Harry Taurasi as Django Lovell
 Laurel Waghorn as Virginia Otis

Episodes

References

External links
 
 Stream The Canterville Ghost for free on BYUtv

2021 British television series debuts
2021 British television series endings
Television shows based on British novels
English-language television shows
Films based on The Canterville Ghost
Children's and Family Emmy Award winners